"Little Arrows" is a single by English artist Leapy Lee. Released in 1968, it was the first single from his album Little Arrows. Written by Albert Hammond & Mike Hazlewood.

Chart performance
The song peaked at number 2 in his homeland, number 11 on the Billboard Hot Country Singles chart, It also reached number 1 on the RPM Country Tracks chart in Canada. as well as the top 20 on the Hot 100.

Cover versions
"Little Arrows" was covered by Irish showband Brendan O'Brien & the Dixies; it reached No. 1 in Ireland in 1968.
The song was covered by Jimmy Osmond in 1975 as the first single and title track of his album Little Arrows.
It was covered in Spain by singer Karina titled "Las Flechas del Amor", arranged by Waldo de los Ríos. This version hit the top of the Spanish charts for 6 weeks on March 29, 1969. 
In Sweden, the version "Amors pilar" was recorded by Ewa Roos and topped the Swedish singles chart Svensktoppen for 2 weeks in February, 1969. The Swedish lyrics were written by Stikkan Anderson, later manager of ABBA.

References

1968 singles
Leapy Lee songs
Songs written by Albert Hammond
Songs written by Mike Hazlewood
1968 songs
Decca Records singles